The 2019 Bayelsa State House of Assembly election was held on March 9, 2019, to elect members of the Bayelsa State House of Assembly in Nigeria. All the 24 seats were up for election in the Bayelsa State House of Assembly.

Tonye Isenah from PDP representing Kolokuma/Opokuma constituency was elected Speaker, while Abraham Ingobere from PDP representing Brass III constituency was elected Deputy Speaker.

Results 
The result of the election is listed below.

Ayah Bonny from PDP won Southern Ijaw I constituency
 Monday Obolo from PDP won Southern Ijaw II constituency
 Malon Moses from PDP won Southern Ijaw III constituency
 Igbadiwe MacDonald from PDP won Southern Ijaw IV constituency
 Charles Daniel from APC won Brass I constituency
 Timi Agala Omubo from APC won Brass II constituency
 Abraham Ingobere from PDP won Brass III constituency
 Onyinke Godbless from PDP won Sagbama I constituency
 Ben Kenebai from PDP won Sagbama II constituency
 Adikumo Salo from PDP won Sagbama III constituency
 Tonye Isenah from PDP won Kolokuma/Opokuma I constituency
 Fafi Wisdom from PDP won Kolokuma/Opokuma II constituency
 Tare Porri from PDP won Ekeremor I constituency
 Wilson Ayakpo from APC won Ekeremor II constituency
 Michael Ogbere from PDP won Ekeremor III constituency
 Obodor Mitema from PDP won Ogbia I constituency
 Gibson Munalayefa from PDP won Ogbia II constituency
 Ogoli Naomi from PDP won Ogbia III constituency
 Oforji Oboku from PDP won Yenagoa I constituency
 Ebiwou Koku-Obiyai from PDP won Yenagoa II constituency
 Elemefuro Teddy from PDP won Yenagoa III constituency
 Ben Ololo from PDP won Nembe I constituency
 Edward Irigha from APC won Nembe II constituency
 Douglas Samson from APC won Nembe III constituency

References 

Bayelsa
House of Assembly
Bayelsa State House of Assembly elections